Naematelia aurantialba (synonym Tremella aurantialba) is a species of fungus producing yellow, frondose, gelatinous basidiocarps (fruit bodies) parasitic on fruit bodies of another fungus, Stereum hirsutum, on broadleaf trees. In China, where it is called jīn'ěr (金耳; literally "golden ear"), it is cultivated for both food and medical purposes.

References

External links
Tremella aurantialba page (Chinese)
  Tremella aurantialba page (Chinese)
Tremella aurantialba page (Chinese)

Tremellomycetes
Fungi of Asia
Chinese edible mushrooms
Fungi in cultivation
Fungi described in 1990